Linnestad is a village in the municipality of Re, Norway. Its population (SSB 2005) is 229.

Villages in Vestfold og Telemark